The Elks Club and Store Building—Dickenson Lodge #1137, also known as Elks Club or Elks Building, is an Early Commercial building in Dickinson, North Dakota, United States.  It was built in 1913.  It has been used as a meeting hall, a specialty store, and a business.  The building was listed on the National Register of Historic Places in 2008.

The building also hosted the Dickinson Normal School, predecessor of Dickinson State University.

The building was vacant for more than 20 years.  The city of Dickinson took ownership of the building in December 2001.  EPA Brownsfield Cleanup grant funding of $200,000 assisted in abatement of asbestos, lead, and mold; the city contributed $94,000 in cleanup completed in 2005.

References

Buildings and structures completed in 1913
Clubhouses on the National Register of Historic Places in North Dakota
Dickinson, North Dakota
Buildings designated early commercial in the National Register of Historic Places in North Dakota
Elks buildings
1913 establishments in North Dakota
National Register of Historic Places in Stark County, North Dakota